Southport Lagoon is a rural locality in the local government area (LGA) of Huon Valley in the South-east LGA region of Tasmania. The 2016 census recorded a population of nil for the state suburb of Southport Lagoon.

History 
Southport Lagoon is a confirmed locality.

Geography
The waters of the Tasman Sea form the eastern and southern boundaries. Southport Lagoon, the body of water, is contained within the locality.

Road infrastructure 
Route C636 (South Cape Road) passes to the west.

References

Towns in Tasmania
Localities of Huon Valley Council